Melville Peninsula is a large peninsula in the Canadian Arctic north of Hudson Bay. To the east is Foxe Basin and to the west the Gulf of Boothia. To the north the Fury and Hecla Strait separates it from Baffin Island. To the south Repulse Bay and Frozen Strait separate it from Southampton Island at the north end of Hudson Bay. On the southwest it is connected to the mainland by the Rae Isthmus, named after the Arctic explorer John Rae.

Between 1821 and 1823 its east side was mapped by William Edward Parry, who named the peninsula (along with Melville Island) after Robert Dundas, 2nd Viscount Melville First Sea Lord of the Admirality. Since 1999, it has been part of Nunavut. Before that, it was part of the District of Franklin. Most of the peninsula lies in Nunavut's Qikiqtaaluk Region, while its southwesternmost section, around Repulse Bay, lies in the Kivalliq Region. Communities on the peninsula include the hamlets of Naujaat and Sanirajak. The hamlet of Igloolik is located on an island lying just off the northeastern coast of the peninsula. Adjoining Igloolik is Igloolik Airport.

References

Further reading

 Bolton, Thomas Elwood. Geology of Ordovician rocks, Melville Peninsula and region, southeastern district of Franklin. Ottawa: Energy, Mines and Resources Canada, 1977. 
 Dredge, Lynda A. 2000. "Age and Origin of Upland Block Fields on Melville Peninsula, Eastern Canadian Arctic". Geografiska Annaler Series A: Physical Geography. 82, no. 4: 443–454.
 Dredge, L. A. Quaternary Geology of Southern Melville Peninsula, Nunavut Surface Deposits, Glacial History, Environmental Geology, and Till Geochemistry. Ottawa: Geological Survey of Canada, 2002. 
 Frisch, T. Precambrian Geology of the Prince Albert Hills, Western Melville Peninsula, Northwest Territories. Ottawa, Canada: Geological Survey of Canada, 1982. 
 Henderson, J. R. Structure and Metamorphism of the Aphebian Penrhyn Group and Its Archean Basement Complex in the Lyon Inlet Area, Melville Peninsula, District of Franklin. Ottawa, Ont., Canada: Geological Survey of Canada, 1983. 
 Mathiassen, Therkel, and Peter Freuchen. Contributions to the Geography of Baffin Land and Melville Peninsula. Copenhagen: Gyldendalske Boghandel, 1933.
 Schau, Mikkel. Geology of the Archean Prince Albert Group in the Richards Bay Area, Northeastern Melville Peninsula, District of Franklin, Northwest Territories. Ottawa: Geological Survey of Canada, 1997. 

Peninsulas of Qikiqtaaluk Region